This is a list of television programs broadcast on the cable and satellite TV channel Disney Junior in the United States.

Current programming

Original programming

Animated series

Acquired programming

Animated series

Reruns of ended series

Interstitial programming

Animated series
 Chip 'N Dale's Nutty Tales
 Disney Junior Music: Nursery Rhymes
 Disney Junior Music: Ready for Preschool
 Disney Tsum Tsum
 Doc Toy Hospital
 Me & Mickey
 Meet Spidey and His Amazing Friends
 Mickey Mouse: Hot Diggity-Dog Tales
 Mickey's Mousekersize
 Minnie's Bow-Toons
 Rise Up, Sing Out
 Spookley Music Videos
 Sunny Bunnies
 Winnie the Pooh (Working Title)
 Untitled Doc McStuffins Stop Motion Shorts

Future programming

Original programming

Animated series

Acquired programming

Animated series

Former programming

Original programming

Animated series

Acquired programming

Animated series

Reruns of Playhouse Disney series

Live action series

Animated series

Former interstitial programming

Live-action series
 A Poem Is
 Bunnytown Shorts
 Choo Choo Soul
 Muppet Babies Play Date
 Muppet Moments
 Ooh, Aah & You
 Quiet Is...
 Special Agent Oso: Three Healthy Steps
 Where Is Warehouse Mouse?

Animated series
Aliens Love Underpants
 Big Block SingSong
 The Bite-Sized Adventures of Sam Sandwich
 Calling all T.O.T.S.
 Can You Teach My Alligator Manners?
 Cars Toons Mater's Tall Tales
 Chuggington: Badge Quest
 Dance-a-Lot Robot
Dance with Mira
 Disney Junior Music: Lullabies
 DJ Melodies
 The Doc Files
 Happy Monster Band
 Handy Manny's School for Tools
 It's UnBungalievable
 Jake's Buccaneer Blast
 Jake's Never Land Pirate School
 Lights, Camera, Lexi!
 Lou and Lou: Safety Patrol
 Mama Hook Knows Best!
 Marvel Super Hero Adventures
 Mickey Mouse
 Mission Force One: Connect and Protect
 Molang
 Muppet Babies: Show and Tell
 Nina Needs to Go!
 PJ Masks Music Videos
 PJ Masks Shorts
 Playing With Skully
 Rhythm & Rhymes
 Shanna's Show
 Shane's Kindergarten Countdown 
Special Agent Oso: Three Healthy Steps 
Super Simple Songs
Tasty Time with ZeFronk
Toon Bops
 Toy Story Toons
 Whisker Haven
 Yup Yups

Programming blocks

Current

Former

See also
Disney Junior on Disney Channel
List of programs broadcast by Playhouse Disney (precursor)
List of programs broadcast by Disney Channel
List of programs broadcast by Disney XD

References

Disney Junior
Disney Junior (United States)
Disney Junior
Disney Junior original programming
Television programming blocks in the United States
Disney Channel related-lists